Bernard Lee Diamond (December 18, 1912 – November 18, 1990) was a Professor of law and psychiatry at the University of California, Berkeley.  He is primarily known for his contribution to what is known as forensic psychiatry. He was an expert witness for the defense in many well known trials, most notably the trial of Sirhan Sirhan, who was convicted of killing Robert F. Kennedy.  The defense based much of their case on Diamond's testimony that Sirhan was suffering from diminished capacity at the time that he fired the deadly shots. In the 1980's, Jonathon Marks, who was representing Mark David Chapman for his alleged act of murdering John Lennon, brought Dr. Diamond in to perform medical legal evaluations on Chapman, but because Chapman later decided to plead guilty Diamond did not give testimony.

References

External links
Description of Diamond's approach to Forensic Psychiatry
UC Berkeley memorium page dedicated to Dr. Bernard Diamond
Concepts and Controversies in Modern Medicine: Psychiatry and Law: How are They Related?

Further reading

  Kaiser, Robert Blair. "R.F.K. Must Die!": A History of the Robert Kennedy Assassination and Its Aftermath. New York: E.P. Dutton & Co, Inc. 1970.
  Turner, William V., and John G. Christian. The Assassination of Robert F. Kennedy: A Searching Look at the Conspiracy and Cover-up 1968-1978. New York: Random House, 1978.
 Diamond, Bernard L. The Psychiatrist in the Courtroom: Selected Papers of Bernard L. Diamond, M.D.. Analytic Press, 1994

American psychiatrists
American legal scholars
1912 births
1990 deaths
UC Berkeley School of Law faculty
20th-century American physicians